Tschudi (variants: Schudy, Shoudy, Shudi, Schudi, Tschudy) is a surname common in the Canton of Glarus, Switzerland.

History

The Tschudi name can be traced back to 870. After Glarus joined the Swiss Confederation in 1352, various members of the family held high political offices at home and held distinguished positions abroad, including as royal guards.

Several branches of the Tschudi family and their servants' families, who took on their masters' last name, first began emigrating to the United States in the mid-18th century (1700s), where the name Tschudi had its spelling changed to Judah, Judy, Juday, Judey, and also Shoudy and Study.  All are still in use.

People

Aegidius Tschudi (1505–1572), a Swiss statesman and historian.
Burkat Shudi (1702–1773), an English harpsichord maker
Fridolin Tschudi (1912–1966), Swiss author and humorist 
Gilles Tschudi (born 1957), actor
Hans-Peter Tschudi (1913–2002), Swiss politician, member of the Swiss Federal Council
Herbert Bolivar Tschudy (1874–1946), painter, Curator of Contemporary Art at the Brooklyn Museum, New York
Johann Jakob von Tschudi (1818–1889), Swiss naturalist, explorer and diplomat 
Lill Tschudi (1911–2004), Swiss artist
Otto Tschudi (born 1949), a Norwegian alpine skier
Ralph Tschudi (1890–1975) a Norwegian sailor, competed in the 1920 Summer Olympics. 
Stephan Tschudi-Madsen (1923-2007) a Norwegian art historian.

Other people called Tschudi

Christopher (1571–1629) was a knight of Malta and a linguist who served in the French and Spanish armies
Dominic (1596–1654) was abbot of Muri and wrote Origo et genealogia gloriosissimorum comitum de Habsburg (1651), second (enlarged) edition Muri, 1702 (cf. also E. Haller, Schweizerbibliothek, 1785,  vol. II, No. 1904).
Iwan (1816–1887) was author of a guide-book to Switzerland, which appeared in 1875 under the name of Schweizerführer
Joseph was a Benedictine monk at Einsiedeln, wrote a history of his abbey (1823)
John Henry (1670–1729) wrote Beschreibung des Lands Glarus (1714)
John Thomas (1714–1788) left several manuscripts on the local history of Glarus
John James (1722–1784) compiled a family history from 900 to 1500
John Louis Baptist (died 1784) was a naturalist who settled in Metz
Frederick (1820–1886) was the author of Das Thierleben der Alpenwelt (1853)
John Jacob Tschudy (1826-1899) helped manage the colony of New Glarus, Wisconsin from 1846 to 1852
Lill (1911–2004) was a Swiss painter and linocut artist
Louis Leonard (1700–1779) and Joseph Anthony (1703–1770) were brothers and both worked in the Neapolitan service
Valentine (1499–1555) was a pupil of Huldrych Zwingli, whom he afterwards succeeded as pastor of Glarus, where his services were attended by both Romanists and Protestants

Other uses
 The Tschudi Group, a Norwegian shipping company

References
 

Surnames